S Club Search was a CBBC reality television show that documents the audition process and formation for the pop group S Club Juniors in 2001. The original concept was that the children would perform at Wembley as a support act to S Club 7 on their S Club 7 Carnival 2002 tour, but their appearance at Wembley was considered such a success that 19 Entertainment, the management company that had created S Club 7 and auditioned S Club Juniors, decided they should perform as a support act at all of the venues on the Carnival tour. Following the tour, the eight children went on to form the group "S Club Juniors" (later renamed to "S Club 8") and had six top ten UK hits.

Selected candidates 
 Aaron Renfree
 Calvin Goldspink
 Daisy Evans
 Frankie Sandford
 Hannah Richings
 Jay Asforis
 Rochelle Wiseman
 Stacey McClean

Connor Daley left the group soon after its formation to accept a scholarship to study ballet at a performing arts school.

Audition venues 
Manchester
Glasgow
Cardiff
London

Episodes

References

External links

2000s British children's television series
2001 British television series debuts
2001 British television series endings
BBC children's television shows
British music television shows
S Club 7 television series
S Club 8
Television series based on singers and musicians